Roy Kitto Abbott (30 August 1927 – 19 March 2004) was an Australian politician who represented the South Australian House of Assembly seat of Spence from 1975 to 1989 for the Labor Party. He was Minister of Community Welfare in the Corcoran government in 1979, and Minister of Transport (1982-1985), Minister of Marine (1982-1988), and Minister of Forests, Minister of Lands and Minister of Repatriation (1985-1988) in the Bannon government.

References

Members of the South Australian House of Assembly
Australian Labor Party members of the Parliament of South Australia
1927 births
2004 deaths
20th-century Australian politicians